Sir Godfrey Hilton Thomson FRSE DCL (27 March 1881 – 9 February 1955) was an English educational psychologist known as a critical pioneer in intelligence research.

The Godfrey Thomson Unit for Research at Moray College in Edinburgh is named in his honour.

Life
Godfrey Thomson was born in Carlisle, Cumbria on 27 March 1881. He was the son of Charles Thomson and his wife, Jane Hilton. His parents separated when he was a young boy, and his mother moved the two of them to her native town of Felling located in Tyneside. It was here that he attended High Felling School. He was then awarded a scholarship to Rutherford College of Technology. He proceeded to study at Armstrong College in Newcastle and then moved on to study at the University of Strasbourg under Professor Ferdinand Braun, working on Hertzian waves.

He worked at Armstrong College, Newcastle upon Tyne (a college of the University of Durham, England) from 1906 to 1925, before moving to the
University of Edinburgh from 1925 until 1951. It was here that he was the Bell Professor of Education and Director of the Moray House Teacher Training College.

His research began in psychophysics,
but he became best known for his criticism of Spearman's general factor in intelligence. Pursuing this interest led to a major work on factor analysis of mental ability.

Additionally, Thomson was active in work on the relationship between intelligence and fertility, conducting some of the first nationally representative sample research, which concluded that this relationship was negative.

In 1926 he was elected a Fellow of the Royal Society of Edinburgh. His proposers were Ralph Allan Sampson, Alexander Morgan, Sir Edmund Taylor Whittaker and Norman Kemp Smith. He served as the Society's Vice President from 1954 to 1955.

In 1931 he was responsible for organizing and analyzing the Scottish Mental Survey: Scotland's contribution to a European assessment of comparison between different countries in school examinations and their values.

Thomson was president of the British Psychological Society from 1945-1946.

He was knighted by King George VI in 1949.

He lived his later years at 5 Ravelston Dykes in western Edinburgh.

Publications

Instinct, Intelligence and Character (1924)
A Modern Philosophy of Education (1929)

Family

In 1912 he married Jane ("Jennie") Hutchinson (later Lady Jane Thomson), who was a fellow lecturer at the Armstrong College. They had one son, the diplomat Hector Thomson (1917-2008).

References

External links 
 Individual Differences: Godfrey H. Thomson (1881 -1955) 
 http://www.ed.ac.uk/education/about-us/maps-estates-history/history/godfrey-thomson
 http://libraryblogs.is.ed.ac.uk/godfreythomsonproject/

1881 births
1955 deaths
Academics of Durham University
Academics of the University of Edinburgh
English psychologists
Intelligence researchers
Knights Bachelor
Foreign associates of the National Academy of Sciences
People from Felling
20th-century psychologists
Alumni of Armstrong College, Durham